Club Harbor is located in Pipe, Wisconsin.

History
The building was opened as a stagecoach stop. In large part, it served those travelling along a military road connecting Fort Howard and Fort Winnebago. Beginning in 1856, it was operated by Jacob Fuhrman. The building was listed on the National Register of Historic Places in 1980 and on the State Register of Historic Places in 1989.

References

Stagecoach stations on the National Register of Historic Places
Hotel buildings on the National Register of Historic Places in Wisconsin
National Register of Historic Places in Fond du Lac County, Wisconsin
Greek Revival architecture in Wisconsin
Brick buildings and structures
Hotel buildings completed in 1846